Boxing  was an African Games event at its inaugural edition in 1965 and has continued to feature prominently at the competition in each of its subsequent editions.

Editions

Medal table 
As of 2015:

External links
 Boxing results at the All-Africa Games (amateur-boxing.strefa.pl)

 
Boxing
All-Africa Games
All-Africa Games
All-Africa Games